The Vice Squad is a 1931 American Pre-Code drama film directed by John Cromwell, written by Oliver H.P. Garrett, and starring Paul Lukas, Kay Francis, Judith Wood, William B. Davidson, Rockliffe Fellowes, Esther Howard and Monte Carter. It was released on May 30, 1931, by Paramount Pictures.

Plot
“The vice squad trick a foreign embassy into squealing on an infamous gang of crooks.”

Cast 
Paul Lukas as Stephen Lucarno
Kay Francis as Alice Morrison
Judith Wood as Madeleine Hunt
William B. Davidson as Magistrate Tom Morrison
Rockliffe Fellowes as Detective-Sergeant Mather 
Esther Howard as Josie
Monte Carter as Max Miller 
Juliette Compton as Ambassador's Wife
G. Pat Collins as Pete
Phil Tead as Tony 
Davison Clark as Doctor
Tom Wilson as Night Court Attendant 
James Durkin as Second Magistrate
William Arnold as Prosecutor

Footnotes

References
Canham, Kingsley. 1976. The Hollywood Professionals, Volume 5: King Vidor, John Cromwell, Mervyn LeRoy. The Tantivy Press, London.

External links 
 

1931 films
American drama films
1931 drama films
Paramount Pictures films
Films directed by John Cromwell
American black-and-white films
1930s English-language films
1930s American films